William Lord Wright (November 14, 1879 Bellefontaine, Ohio – April 21, 1947 Hollywood, California) was an American screenwriter and film producer.

Wright was a newspaper reporter in his hometown of Bellefontaine, Ohio, before going to Hollywood in 1917 where he wrote film scripts for Selig Studios for many years. He then went to work for Pathé Exchange as chief story editor. Later he went to work for Universal Studios as head of the scenario department.

He wrote the book Photoplay Writing (1922), published by Falk Publishing Co., New York which was used by the New York Institute of Photography.

Wright died in Hollywood, California, on April 21, 1947. He was survived by Sarah Wright of 1741½ N. Van Ness Avenue, Hollywood, California. He was buried at Hollywood Park Cemetery on April 24, 1947.

Filmography
Writer
 'Twixt Loyalty and Love (1910)
 The Landing of the Hose Reel (1915) (short) scenario
 The Run on Percy (1915) (short)
 Ace of Spades (1925) (15 episodes)
 The Great Circus Mystery (1925)
 Perils of the Wild (1925)
 Fighting with Buffalo Bill (1926) (serial)
 Blake of Scotland Yard
 The Vanishing Rider (1928) (serial)
 Plunging Hoofs (1929)
 Hoofbeats of Vengeance (1929)
 The Harvest of Hate (1929)
 
Producer
 The White Horseman (1921) (serial)
 The Price of Fear (1928) Supervisor
 The Border Wildcat (1929) Supervisor
 Grit Wins (1929) Supervisor
 The Ridin' Demon (1929) Supervisor
 The Smiling Terror (1929) Supervisor
 Tarzan the Tiger (1929) (serial) Supervisor
 The Tip Off (1929)
 Wolves of the City (1929) Supervisor
 The Indians Are Coming (1930) (serial) Supervisor

References

External links

American male screenwriters
1879 births
1947 deaths
People from Bellefontaine, Ohio
Screenwriters from Ohio
Film producers from Ohio
20th-century American male writers
20th-century American screenwriters